Solans is a surname. People with the surname include:

 David Solans (born 1996), Spanish actor
 Eugenio Domingo Solans (1945–2004), Spanish economist and civil servant
 Jan Solans (born 1997), Spanish rally driver
 Josep Pintat-Solans (1925–2007), second Prime Minister of Andorra
 Nil Solans (born 1992), Spanish rally driver

See also
 Solan (disambiguation)